Corruption in Norway ranks amongst the lowest in the world.

On Transparency International's 2022 Corruption Perceptions Index, Norway scored 84 on a scale from 0 ("highly corrupt") to 100 ("very clean"). When ranked by score, Norway ranked 4th among the 180 countries in the Index, where the country ranked first is perceived to have the most honest public sector.  For comparison, the best score was 90 (ranked 1), and the worst score was 12 (ranked 180).

In 2017 Norway was ranked the most corrupt country in Scandinavia after Yara International, Telenor, Statoil, Norsk Hydro and Kongsberg, all large Norwegian companies in which the state government owns substantial stakes, faced corruption charges.

According to a report by the Norwegian School of Economics, "corruption in Norway is typically present at the municipal administration, municipal planning and building departments, and procurement departments". The report also stated that "research shows that in some municipalities, ties between public and private parties can sometimes be too close. Some municipalities are very active in their anticorruption work, and they have good notification channels and active control committees. In other places, there is a significant number of leaders in the municipal sector who have experienced attempts of corruption – and those trying to report the matter meet resistance."

See also 
 Crime in Norway

References

External links

 
Norway
Crime in Norway by type
Politics of Norway